The Speciethaler was the currency of Schleswig-Holstein until 1866, located in the border region of present day Denmark and Germany. 

It was divided into 60 Schilling Courant, each of 12 Pfennig. The Speciethaler was equal to the Danish rigsdaler specie.

Production
From 1842, Danish coins were issued denominated in both rigsbank skilling (the subunit of the rigsdaler specie) and schilling courant, for use in both Denmark and Schleswig-Holstein. 

These were supplemented in 1850 and 1851 with 1 Dreiling (3 Pfennig), 1 Sechsling (6 Pfennig) and 1 Schilling pieces, Schleswig-Holstein's last coins. The Prussian Vereinsthaler was introduced following Schleswig-Holstein's incorporation into Prussia.

Currencies of the Kingdom of Denmark
Currencies of Germany
History of Schleswig-Holstein
Modern obsolete currencies
1866 disestablishments in Europe
Duchy of Schleswig